Tubulin tyrosine ligase-like family, member 3 is a protein that in humans is encoded by the TTLL3 gene.

Model organisms

Model organisms have been used in the study of TTLL3 function. A conditional knockout mouse line, called Ttll3tm1a(EUCOMM)Wtsi was generated as part of the International Knockout Mouse Consortium program — a high-throughput mutagenesis project to generate and distribute animal models of disease to interested scientists — at the Wellcome Trust Sanger Institute.

Male and female animals underwent a standardized phenotypic screen to determine the effects of deletion. Twenty three tests were carried out on mutant mice but no significant abnormalities were observed.

References

Further reading 

Genes mutated in mice